Henry Spencer Tatchell (July 16, 1924 – January 8, 2007) was a Canadian professional ice hockey defenceman. During the 1942–43 NHL season he played for the New York Rangers in his only NHL game. Prior to turning professional, Tatchell played junior ice hockey in Winnipeg, Manitoba with both the Winnipeg Rangers and Winnipeg Monarchs. He was born in Lloydminster, Saskatchewan.

Career highlights 
During the 1942-43 season, he played in the Eastern Hockey League with the New York Rovers. It was during this season that Tatchell his only opportunity to play in the NHL as he was called up to play in one game with the New York Rangers.

During the 1943-44 season Tatchell played with the Cornwallis Navy. On 12 January 1944, the New York Rangers traded to Tatchell to the Montreal Canadiens (along with Hub Macey and Nestor Lubeck) for Kilby MacDonald, but Tatchell spent the following year in military service and did not play in another NHL game.

Following World War II, Tatchell played with both the Nelson Maple Leafs and the Kimberley Dynamiters in the Western International Hockey League before retiring from hockey in 1954.

See also
List of players who played only one game in the NHL

References

External links

RootsChat.Com

1924 births
2007 deaths
Canadian ice hockey defencemen
Canadian military personnel of World War II
Ice hockey people from Alberta
Kimberley Dynamiters players
New York Rangers players
New York Rovers players
Sportspeople from Lloydminster
Winnipeg Monarchs players
Winnipeg Rangers players
Canadian expatriate ice hockey players in the United States